Geraldine Hancock Forbes is a Canadian educator and a professor in the department of History at State University of New York Oswego, with the rank of  distinguished teaching professor.

Biography
Forbes earned B.Ed. degree from the University of Alberta.  She also earned master's degree and Ph.D.in history in 1972 from the University of Illinois.

Forbes worked as social studies teacher from 1964–1966 in County High School, Nova Scotia, Canada. She then worked in the History Department, State University of New York Oswego in 1971 as assistant professor; in 1974 as associate professor; in 1981 as professor; and 1998 as distinguished teaching professor. Forbes has done research on the women of Bengal.

In 2008, she was appointed to the advisory committee of SPARROW: Sound and Picture Archives for Research on Women.

Awards
Forbes's book Positivism in Bengal was awarded Rabindra Puraskar.

Selected works
 Shudha Mazumdar: Memoirs of an Indian Woman(1989)
 Manmohini Zutshi Sahagal: An Indian Freedom Fighter recalls her life (1994)
 Women in Modern India (1996)
 Women in colonial India:Essays on Politics, Medicine and Historiography (2005) (Delhi: Chronicle Books)
 Because I am a Woman: Child Widow: A Memoir from Colonial India (2010)

References

Living people
Bengali-language writers
Canadian Indologists
Canadian academics of women's studies
Canadian women non-fiction writers
Historians of India
Recipients of the Rabindra Puraskar
State University of New York at Oswego faculty
University of Alberta alumni
University of Illinois alumni
Year of birth missing (living people)